Anyphaenidae is a family of araneomorph spiders, sometimes called anyphaenid sac spiders. They are distinguished from the sac spiders of the family Clubionidae and other spiders by having the abdominal spiracle placed one third to one half of the way anterior to the spinnerets toward the epigastric furrow on the underside of the abdomen.  In most spiders the spiracle is just anterior to the spinnerets. Like clubionids, anyphaenids have eight eyes arranged in two rows, conical anterior spinnerets and are wandering predators that build silken retreats, or sacs, usually on plant terminals, between leaves, under bark or under rocks. There are more than 600 species in over 50 genera worldwide.

The family is widespread and includes such common genera as Anyphaena (worldwide except tropical Africa and Asia) and Hibana (New World). Only one species (A. accentuata) occurs in northwestern Europe.

Species in the latter genus are important predators in several agricultural systems, especially tree crops.  They are able to detect and feed on insect eggs, despite their poor eyesight.  They share this ability at least with some miturgid spiders.

Genera
, the World Spider Catalog accepts the following genera:

Acanthoceto Mello-Leitão, 1944 — South America
Aljassa Brescovit, 1997 — South America
Amaurobioides O. Pickard-Cambridge, 1883 — Africa, Chile, Australia, New Zealand
Anyphaena Sundevall, 1833 — Asia, Americas, Europe, Algeria
Anyphaenoides Berland, 1913 — South America, Central America, Trinidad
Arachosia O. Pickard-Cambridge, 1882 — South America, North America, Cuba, Panama
Araiya Ramírez, 2003 — Chile, Argentina
Australaena Berland, 1942 — French Polynesia
Axyracrus Simon, 1884 — Chile, Argentina
Aysenia Tullgren, 1902 — Chile, Argentina
Aysenoides Ramírez, 2003 — Chile, Argentina
Aysha Keyserling, 1891 — South America, Panama
Bromelina Brescovit, 1993 — Colombia, Brazil, Venezuela
Buckupiella Brescovit, 1997 — Brazil, Argentina
Coptoprepes Simon, 1884 — Chile, Argentina
Ferrieria Tullgren, 1901 — Chile, Argentina
Gamakia Ramírez, 2003 — Chile
Gayenna Nicolet, 1849 — South America, Mexico
Gayennoides Ramírez, 2003 — Chile
Hatitia Brescovit, 1997 — Ecuador, Peru, Colombia
Hibana Brescovit, 1991 — North and South America, Caribbean
Iguarima Brescovit, 1997 — Brazil, Ecuador
Ilocomba Brescovit, 1997 — Colombia
Isigonia Simon, 1897 — South America, Panama
Italaman Brescovit, 1997 — Colombia, Brazil, Argentina
Jessica Brescovit, 1997 — South America
Josa Keyserling, 1891 — South America, Costa Rica, Mexico
Katissa Brescovit, 1997 — Central America, South America
Lepajan Brescovit, 1993 — Ecuador, Panama
Lupettiana Brescovit, 1997 — Costa Rica, Caribbean, South America, United States
Macrophyes O. Pickard-Cambridge, 1893 — Mexico, Central America, South America
Mesilla Simon, 1903 — Colombia, Ecuador
Monapia Simon, 1897 — Chile, Uruguay, Argentina
Negayan Ramírez, 2003 — Chile, Argentina, Peru
Osoriella Mello-Leitão, 1922 — South America
Otoniela Brescovit, 1997 — South America
Oxysoma Nicolet, 1849 — Chile, Argentina, Brazil
Patrera Simon, 1903 — South America, Central America
Phidyle Simon, 1880 — Chile
Philisca Simon, 1884 — Chile, Argentina
Pippuhana Brescovit, 1997 — United States, Panama, Brazil
Rathalos Lin & Li, 2022 — China
Sanogasta Mello-Leitão, 1941 — South America
Selknamia Ramírez, 2003 — Chile, Argentina
Shuyushka Dupérré & Tapia, 2016 — Ecuador
Sillus F. O. Pickard-Cambridge, 1900 — Mexico, Central America, Brazil
Sinophaena Lin & Li, 2021 — China
Tafana Simon, 1903 — Venezuela, Ecuador, Colombia
Tasata Simon, 1903 — South America
Temnida Simon, 1896 — South America
Teudis O. Pickard-Cambridge, 1896 — South America, Central America
Thaloe Brescovit, 1993 — Cuba
Timbuka Brescovit, 1997 — South America, Central America, Mexico
Tomopisthes Simon, 1884 — Chile, Argentina
Umuara Brescovit, 1997 — Venezuela, Brazil, Peru
Wulfila O. Pickard-Cambridge, 1895 — North America, South America, Central America, Caribbean
Wulfilopsis Soares & Camargo, 1955 — Brazil
Xiruana Brescovit, 1997 — South America

See also
 List of Anyphaenidae species

References

External links

Family Anyphaenidae Sac spiders, ghost spiders
 Video of Hibana, an anyphaenid from Florida

 
Articles containing video clips
Araneomorphae families
Taxa named by Philipp Bertkau